Sant'Eufemia is an ancient Roman Catholic church in Piacenza, region of Emilia Romagna, Italy. The Church is dedicated to Saint Euphemia, because her relics were supposedly interred within the church. It had been intended as the burial place for bishop Aldo Gabrielli.

A church at the site was present before the year 1000, but only after 1100, did the then Bishop Aldo, build a temple and adjoining monastery. In the 14th century, the church was supervised by Canonici Regolari di Santissimi Salvatore until the suppression during Napoleonic period.

After 1100, the portico with pillars Romanesque capitals was added. In the eighteenth century: a Baroque gate was introduced on the facade. The bell tower was demolished and only rebuilt only in 19th-century. The church has a twelfth-century mosaic depicting St George.

References

Roman Catholic churches in Piacenza
14th-century Roman Catholic church buildings in Italy
Romanesque architecture in Piacenza